The Mahenge toad or Loveridge's forest toad (Mertensophryne loveridgei) is a species of toad in the family Bufonidae. It is endemic to Tanzania; its common name refers to the Mahenge Plateau where it can be found. Its natural habitats are tropical forests and woodlands. It is not considered threatened by the IUCN.

References

loveridgei
Endemic fauna of Tanzania
Amphibians of Tanzania
Taxonomy articles created by Polbot
Amphibians described in 1991